Karabük University is a public university in Karabük, Turkey. It was founded in 2007 as one of the 17 new universities of that time in Turkey.  Karabük University, ranked among the 801- 1000 in the list of the best universities in the world published by Times Higher Education (THE) for 2020 and 801-1000 in the 2021 World rankings.

History

Academic structure 
The academic structure of KBÜ contains fourteen faculties, four graduate schools, four schools and seven vocational schools.

Faculties 

Faculty of Literature
Faculty of Science
Faculty of Fethi Toker Fine Arts and Design
Faculty of Economic and Administrative Sciences
Faculty of Theology
Faculty of Management
Faculty of Engineering
Faculty of Technical Education
Faculty of Technology
Faculty of Medicine

Institutes 
Graduate School of Iron and Steel
Graduate School of Natural and Applied Sciences
Graduate School of Social Sciences
Graduate School of Health Sciences

Schools 
School of Health
School of Hasan Doğan Physical Education and Sports
School of Foreign Languages

Vocational Schools 
Karabük Vocational School
Eskipazar Vocational School (in Eskipazar)
Safranbolu Vocational School (in Safranbolu)
Yenice Vocational School (in Yenice

Facilities

Main campus 
The main campus is in the Balıklarkayası suburb of Karabük. Most of the university's centers and faculties are on campus.

Hospital

Karabük University Stadium 
Karabük University Stadium is at the end and at the highest point of the campus. Beside its main function as a football pitch, the stadium serves as a Physical Education and Sports School. Its unique crescent and star exterior form distinguishes it from other stadiums. It serves as the main gathering place for large-scale events such as football games, graduation ceremonies, concerts, festivals, fairs etc.

Karabük University Square 
Karabük University Square welcomes students and other visitors right after the entrance bridge of the campus. The square is between the Rector’s Building and the Faculty Buildings. It serves as a gathering place for small celebrations, concerts, etc. Its unique design enriches the campus atmosphere and promotes Karabük University from others.

Affiliations
The university is a member of the Caucasus University Association.

Partner universities 
  Sakarya University, Turkey

References

External links 
 Official Web site

Universities and colleges in Turkey
Karabük
Educational institutions established in 2007
Buildings and structures in Karabük Province
2007 establishments in Turkey